Doug Mansolino (born September 20, 1956 in Plainfield, New Jersey) is an American former coach in Major League Baseball (MLB). , he is a field coordinator for the Atlanta Braves.

Career
Mansolino served as a coach with the Chicago White Sox (1992–1996), Milwaukee Brewers (1998–1999), Detroit Tigers (2000–2001), and Houston Astros (2005–2007). On September 30, 2007, it was announced that he would not return as third base coach for the Astros.

Mansolino was a manager in Minor League Baseball twice; in 1991 with the Triple-A Vancouver Canadiens, and for part of the 1997 season with the Class A Capital City Bombers.

Personal life
Mansolino attended Huntington Beach High School, then played college baseball for Golden West College and later the Oral Roberts Golden Eagles. He is an avid collector of antique baseball gloves. During the 2006 season, when the Astros were playing a series in Milwaukee, he found a catcher's mitt from 1903. A son, Tony, was a minor league infielder, and has also managed in the minor leagues.

References

External links
 Minor league managerial statistics at Baseball-Reference.com
 Major league coaching statistics at Retrosheet

1956 births
Living people
Detroit Tigers coaches
Houston Astros coaches
Chicago White Sox coaches
Milwaukee Brewers coaches
Minor league baseball managers
Major League Baseball third base coaches
Major League Baseball first base coaches
Major League Baseball bench coaches